Butler Parker is a fictitious British character who was, despite his ostentatious Britishness, created by a German pulp fiction author and became eventually the protagonist of a German TV series.

Author 
Butler Parker was the brainchild of the very successful and productive author Günther Dönges (1923–August 2001) who often used Anglo-Saxon aliases due to the in Germany widespread opinion that only Anglo-Saxons could write entertaining good crime stories.

Protagonist 
Butler Joshua Parker worked for different employers who would leave him a lot of freedom. However, Butler Parker would always be the main character who cracked the cases and sometimes protected or even rescued his employers. He had a steel-strengthened bowler hat and his umbrella could be used to shoot arrows. Moreover, he drove a classic London taxi which was equipped with a variety of stunning gadgets.

Novels 
Like Jerry Cotton Joshua Parker had an obviously English name and drove an English car. (Although Parker had a traditional London taxi, jam-packed with amazing gadgets instead of a Jaguar E-Type) Both heroes had their first appearances in publications of the publishing house Bastei. But eventually Günter Dönges changed the publisher and took "Butler Parker" with him. Between 1953 and 1992 more than 600 novels were released by Bastei, Pabel and later on by Zauberkreis. In the beginning Butler Parker was in the service of an old lady but later on he had an American boss called Mike Rander. The TV shows him working for Mike Rander (Eckart Dux).

TV show 
Since the novels about Butler Parker were very successful and another fictitious British pulp fiction hero (Percy Stuart) had already been adapted for the TV screen with huge success, the idea of a TV series about Butler Parker seemed to suggest itself. But it lasted only for 26 shows. Still the short life of his TV presence didn't diminish the ongoing success of the novels.

Home media 
The TV series was digitally remastered and released on DVD in 2010, and some of Butler Parker's adventures have been released as audiobooks.

External links 

Website dedicated to Butler Parker (German only)
Website on audio books featuring Butler Parker (German only)

Crime fiction
Detective fiction
Television shows based on German novels
German drama television series
1972 German television series debuts
1973 German television series endings
Television shows set in the United Kingdom
German-language television shows
Das Erste original programming